The 1966 New York Giants season was the franchise's 42nd season in the National Football League (NFL). The season saw the Giants looking to improve on their 7–7 record from 1965. However, they finished in last place in the Eastern Conference with a 1–12–1 record, the worst in franchise history. The 12 losses set a single-season team record that was matched four times before being broken in 2017.

The 1966 Giants surrendered the most points in NFL history for a 14-game season. They allowed 501 points in 14 games, or an average of 35.8 points per game. This total broke the league record for the most points given up in a season. The next most points allowed by a Giants team was 451 in the 2019 season, which was 16 games. The Giants allowed opponents to score more than 30 points in eight of the 14 games, and gave up over 50 points three times. They are the only team in history to give up 500 points in a 14-game season.

On November 27, the Giants played the highest-scoring game in NFL history, losing to the Washington Redskins, 72–41. It was the first of three straight games in which the Giants gave up more than 45 points; they allowed 49 points against the Cleveland Browns and 47 versus the Pittsburgh Steelers.

Roster

Schedule 

With the addition of the expansion Atlanta Falcons, the NFL had an odd number (15) of teams. This necessitated the use of bye weeks. The Giants received the most centrally located bye, in Week 8, thus perfectly dividing their season into two 7-game halves. They lost all seven games after the break. (In contrast, the expansion Falcons were 0–8 before they got their bye in Week 9, but 3–3 afterwards.)

Game summaries

Week 1

Standings

See also 
 1966 NFL season

References 

1960s in the Bronx
New York Giants
New York Giants
New York Giants seasons